Reliance Jio Infocomm Limited, doing business as Jio, is an Indian telecommunications company and a subsidiary of Jio Platforms, headquartered in Navi Mumbai, Maharashtra, India. It operates a national LTE network with coverage across all 22 telecom circles. Jio offers 4G and 4G+ services all over India and 5G service in many cities. Its 6G service is in the works.

Jio soft launched on 27 December 2015 with a beta for partners and employees, and became publicly available on 5 September 2016. It is the largest mobile network operator in India and the third largest mobile network operator in the world with over 42.62 crore (426.2 million) subscribers.

In September 2019, Jio launched a fiber to the home service, offering home broadband, television, and telephone services. , Reliance Industries has raised  by selling nearly 33% equity stake in Jio Platforms.

History

The company was registered in Ambawadi, Ahmedabad, Gujarat on 15 February 2007 as Infotel Broadband Services Limited (IBSL). Although unlisted, IBSL was the only company that won broadband spectrum in all 22 circles in India in the 4G auction that took place earlier that year. Later continuing as RIL's telecom subsidiary, Infotel Broadband Services Limited was renamed as Reliance Jio Infocomm Limited (RJIL) in January 2013.

In June 2015, Jio announced that it would start its operations throughout the country by the end of 2015. However, four months later in October, the company postponed the launch to the first quarter of the financial year 2016–2017.

Later, in July 2015, a PIL filed in the Supreme Court by an NGO called the Centre for Public Interest Litigation, through Prashant Bhushan, challenged the grant of a pan-India license to Jio by the Government of India. The Indian Department of Telecommunications (DoT), however, explained that the rules for 3G and BWA spectrum didn't restrict BWA winners from providing voice telephony. As a result, the PIL was revoked, and the accusations were dismissed.

The 4G services were launched internally on 27 December 2015. The company commercially launched its 4G services on 5 September 2016, offering free data and voice services until 31 December, which was later extended until 31 March 2017. Within the first month, Jio announced that it had acquired 1.6 crore (16 million) subscribers and has crossed 5 crore (50 million) subscriber mark in 83 days since its launch, subsequently crossing 100 million subscribers on 22 February 2017. , it had about 13 crore (130 million) subscribers.

On 5 October 2022, it has launched 5G services to Delhi, Mumbai, Kolkata and Chennai. Varanasi, Siliguri, Bangalore, Hyderabad and Nagpur. As of March 2023, Jio 5G service was available in 365 cities across India.

Network

Spectrum frequency holding summary

Jio owns spectrum in 850 MHz and 1,800 MHz bands in India's 22 circles, and also owns pan-India licensed 2,300 MHz spectrum. The spectrum is valid until 2035. Jio also picked up pan-India licenses in the 700 MHz, 3,500 MHz and 26 GHz spectrum bands in the DoT's 2022 5G auction.

Partnerships

Jio shares spectrum with Reliance Communications. The sharing deal is for 800 MHz band across seven circles other than the 10 circles for which Jio already owns.

Sep 2014 – Acquired undisclosed stake in Airspan Networks for US$5 mn. Deploys Airspan's small cells throughout the network roll out phase.

Sep 2016 – Jio signed a pact with BSNL for intra-circle roaming which would enable users of the operators to use each other's 4G and 2G spectrum in national roaming mode.

Feb 2017 – Jio announced a partnership with Samsung to work on LTE – Advanced Pro and 5G.

Feb 2017 – Partnered with Ciena to deploy transport SDN architecture.

Reliance Jio also partnered with several OSS (Operations Support Systems) & BSS (Business Support System) companies for the deployment of services, like: SAP, HP, IBM, Ericsson, Rancore, Estel Technologies, Subex and Intec Telecom Systems. However, the finalized OSS firms were Ericsson, HP and Friendly Technologies.

Sep 2020 – Partners with Cisco Systems for 5G deployment.

Sep 2020 – Announces partnership with HFCL to deploy Fiber-optic communication to support the rollout of FTTx services.

Oct 2022 - Contracts with Nokia & Ericsson for supplying standalone 5G network equipment.

Summit Digitel Infrastructure 
Summit Digitel Infrastructure (formerly known as Reliance Jio Infratel Private Limited) operates 136,000 telecom sites.

Products and services

Mobile broadband
The company launched its 4G broadband services throughout India in September 2016. It was slated to release in December 2015 after some reports said that the company was waiting to receive final permits from the government. Jio offers fourth-generation (4G) data and voice services, along with peripheral services like instant messaging and streaming movies and music.

JioFiber
In August 2018, Jio began to test a new triple play fiber to the home service known tentatively as Jio GigaFiber, including broadband internet with speeds ranging from 100 to 1000 Mbit/s, as well as television and landline telephone services.

In August 2019, it was announced that the service would officially launch on 5 September 2019 as JioFiber, in honour of the company's third anniversary. Jio also announced plans to offer streaming of films still in theatres ("First Day First Show") to eligible JioFiber subscribers.

JioBusiness 
In March 2021, the company has launched connectivity solutions for businesses bundled with services provided by Jio Platforms, Reliance Retail and Office 365.

Jio Branded Devices

LYF smartphones

In June 2015, Jio entered into an agreement with domestic handset maker Intex to supply 4G handsets capable of voice over LTE (VoLTE). However, in October 2015, Jio announced that it would be launching its own mobile handset brand named LYF.

On 25 January 2016, the company launched its LYF smartphone series starting with Water 1, through its chain of electronic retail outlets, Reliance Retail. Three more handset models have been released so far, namely Water 2, Earth 1, and Flame 1.

JioPhone is a line of feature phones marketed by Jio. The first model, released in August 2017 (with public pre-orders beginning 24 August 2017), was positioned as an "affordable" LTE-compatible feature phone. It runs on the KaiOS platform (derived from the defunct Firefox OS), and includes a 2.4-inch display, a dual-core processor, 4 GB of internal storage, near-field communication support, a suite of Jio-branded apps (including the voice assistant HelloJio), and a Jio-branded application store. It also supports a "TV cable" accessory for output to an external display.

In July 2018, the company unveiled the JioPhone 2, an updated model in a keyboard bar form factor with a QWERTY keyboard and horizontal display. Jio also announced that Facebook, WhatsApp, and YouTube apps would become available for the two phones.

Jionet Wi-Fi
Prior to its pan-India launch of 4G data and telephony services, the firm has started providing free Wi-Fi hotspot services in cities throughout India including Surat, Ahmedabad in Gujarat, and Visakhapatnam in Andhra Pradesh, Indore, Jabalpur, Dewas and Ujjain in Madhya Pradesh, select locations of Mumbai in Maharashtra, Kolkata in West Bengal, Lucknow in Uttar Pradesh, Bhubaneswar in Odisha, Mussoorie in Uttarakhand, Collectorate's Office in Meerut, and at MG Road in Vijayawada among others.

In March 2016, Jio started providing free Wi-Fi internet to spectators at six cricket stadiums hosting the 2016 ICC World Twenty20 matches. .

JioPhone Next 
On 24 June 2021, Mukesh Ambani announced the launch of JioPhone Next. It is a fully-featured Android smartphone co-developed with Google as part of its long-term partnership. The budget smartphone was launched in India on 4 November 2021.

The Jio Phone Next will be run by the indigenously built Pragati OS based on Android Go operating system. This phone is classified as an entry-level phone and is aimed at replacing feature phones and providing basic smartphone services efficiently at low specifications.

Jio apps

In May 2016, Jio launched a bundle of multimedia apps on Google Play as part of its upcoming 4G services. While the apps are available to download for everyone, a user will require a Jio SIM card to use some of them.  Notable apps include: 

 JioPages – a web browser for Android devices
 JioChat – instant messaging app
 JioCinema – online HD video library
 JioCloud – cloud-based backup tool
 JioHealth – health services app
 JioNews – e-reader for news
 JioMeet – video-conferencing platform
 JioMoney – online payments/wallet app
 JioSaavn – for online and offline music streaming in English and Indian languages
 JioSecurity – security app
 JioTV – TV Channels streaming service
 JioVoice – VoLTE phone simulator
 MyJio – manage Jio account and digital services associated with it
 JioMart - Online shopping app

Controversies

Issue with incumbents
In September 2016, the Telecom Regulatory Authority of India (TRAI) summoned Jio and the country's existing telecom operators like Airtel, Vodafone, and Idea Cellular to meet and discuss an issue regarding the interconnection between the operators. This was a result after Jio complained to TRAI and Department of Telecom (DoT) about other operators not honoring their commercial agreements to let Jio use their network resources. The company further added that the operators are trying to sabotage its entry into the telecom scene. However, DoT dismissed the request and directed TRAI to help settle the dispute amicably. Moreover, the Cellular Operators Association of India (COAI) requested TRAI to include all the operators in the discussion instead of the three.

The incumbent operators had previously approached the country's PMO to reiterate their stance they "are in no way obliged or in any position to entertain Jio's requests for interconnection points as they do not have either the network or the financial resources to terminate the latter's humongous volumes of potentially asymmetric voice traffic." Responding to this, Mukesh Ambani, owner of Jio, said, "All operators have publicly said last week that they will provide this (interconnect and MNP). So, we are waiting. These are all great companies. They have their own reputations to protect. I am confident they won't violate the law." Commenting about number portability, he added, "The number belongs to the consumer. No operator can cause trouble if they want to change operators." However, on 12 September 2016, Idea Cellular agreed to allow Jio to use 196 of its interconnection access points.

Subscriber data breach
On 10 July 2017, Jio's customer data was allegedly leaked on the website magicapk.com. The website was suspended shortly after the news of the breach broke out.

Farmers' boycott 
During the 2020–2021 Indian Farmers' Protest, farmers across multiple states in northern part of India boycotted and vandalized Jio's towers owing to allegations of Reliance Industries's support to controversial farm laws of India. Jio blamed its competitors Airtel and Vodafone for spreading rumours of "Reliance being an undue beneficiary in the farm bills", an allegation both the companies denied. The company saw a loss of around 25 lakh (2.5 million) subscribers in Punjab and Haryana between November and December 2020.

Bird deaths 
In January 2021, several social media posts started circulating linking bird deaths to Jio's 5G network trials. The claims were found to be fake as 5G trials were not yet permitted. The cause of the death of the birds is determined as due to an outbreak of bird flu.

See also
 Jio Payments Bank
 JioSaavn
 Reliance Foundation
 Reliance Industries Limited
 Telecommunications in India
 List of telecom companies in India
 List of mobile network operators

References

External links

 
 

Companies based in Mumbai
Telecommunications companies of India
Internet service providers of India
Mobile phone companies of India
Indian companies established in 2007
Indian brands
Reliance Industries subsidiaries
Jio
2007 establishments in Maharashtra